Spanish broom may refer to:
 Genista hispanica, a low-growing spiny shrub
 Spartium junceum, a shrub